The EcoCute is an energy-efficient electric heat pump, water heating and supply system that uses heat extracted from the air to heat water for domestic, industrial and commercial use. Instead of the more conventional ammonia or haloalkane gases, EcoCute uses supercritical carbon dioxide as a refrigerant. The technology offers a means of energy conservation and reduces the emission of greenhouse gas.

Etymology 
The name of the EcoCute comes from the Japanese phrase , which literally means "natural refrigerant heat pump water heater".

History 
Modern chemical refrigeration techniques developed after the proposal of the Carnot cycle in 1824. Jacob Perkins invented an ice-making machine that used ether in 1843, and Edmond Carré built a refrigerator that used water and sulfuric acid in 1850. In Japan, Fusanosuke Kuhara, founder of Hitachi, Ltd., made an air conditioner for his own home use using compressed CO2 as a refrigerant.

In 1930 Thomas Midgley Jr. discovered dichlorodifluoromethane, a chlorinated fluorocarbon (CFC) known as freon. CFCs rapidly replaced traditional refrigerant substances, including CO2 (which proved hard to compress for domestic use), for use in heat pumps and refrigerators. But from the 1980s CFCs began to lose favor as refrigerant when their damaging effects on the ozone layer were discovered. Two alternative types of refrigerant, hydrofluorocarbons (HFCs) and hydrochlorofluorocarbons (HCFCs), also lost favor when they were identified as greenhouse gases (additionally, HCFCs were found to be more damaging to the ozone layer than originally thought).  The Vienna Convention for the Protection of the Ozone Layer, the Montreal Protocol and the Kyoto Protocol call for the complete abandonment of such refrigerants by 2030.

In 1989, amid international concern about the effects of chlorofluorocarbons and hydrochlorofluorocarbons on the ozone layer, scientist Gustav Lorentzen and SINTEF patented a method for using CO2 as a refrigerant in heating and cooling. Further research into CO2 refrigeration was then conducted at Shecco (Sustainable Heating and Cooling with CO2) in Brussels, Belgium, leading to increasing use of CO2 refrigerant technology in Europe.

In 1993 the Japanese company Denso, in collaboration with Gustav Lorentzen, developed an automobile air conditioner using CO2 as a refrigerant. They demonstrated the invention at the June 1998 International Institute of Refrigeration/Gustav Lorentzen Conference. After the conference, CRIEPI (Central Research Institute of Electric Power Industry) and TEPCO (The Tokyo Electric Power Company) approached Denso about developing a prototype air conditioner using natural refrigerant materials instead of freon. Together they produced 30 prototype EcoCute units for a year-long experimental installation at locations throughout Japan, from the cold climate of Hokkaidō to hotter Okinawa. After this successful feasibility study, Denso obtained a patent to compress CO2 refrigerant for use in a heat pump from SINTEF in September 2000.

The first commercial domestic EcoCute was marketed in Japan by Corona Corporation in May 2001, and several manufacturers sold 1.5 million units there by October, 2008.

FEPC reported 2 million EcoCute units had been delivered by end of October 2009, with the equivalent CO2 absorption of 9400 km2 of forest.

Features and demand 
In Japan in 1998, water heating accounted for 33.8% of typical domestic energy consumption, with air conditioner and kerosene heater heating accounting for another 26.9% and cooling by air conditioner another 2.3%. Most of the remaining 37% was spent on electrical home appliances, a field where 21st-century innovations in energy conservation began to make considerable energy savings. This left hot water supply as the most difficult area for energy conservation, leaving a gap in the market for the EcoCute. By January 2005, 26 Japanese companies were producing more than 450 models of EcoCute machines, and sales of domestic units increased 130–150% each year between 2001 and 2005.

Denso first introduced the EcoCute outside Japan at the COP9 Milan, Italy on December 9, 2003. From 2007, Denso began concentrating on marketing the EcoCute in the EU. In Japan, the Japanese government incorporated the EcoCute into its CO2 reduction program under the Kyoto Protocol, mandating the installation of 5.2 million units in commercial and domestic properties by 2010. The cost of EcoCute is approximately 500 thousand Japanese yen as of February–March 2009.

EcoCute machine basics 
An EcoCute machine or system consists of a heat pump and hot water storage unit. The sealed components are serially connected with refrigerant CO2 gas in circulation.
 At the first stage, a heat exchanger collects heat from the air outside to use as energy for the refrigerant. Air flow is usually obtained using a centrifugal fan; in cold areas with ambient temperatures around −20 to −25°C an auxiliary fan heater is attached.
 A gas compressor is used to increase the temperature of the gaseous CO2 refrigerant to around 100°C under pressure of 10MPa via adiabatic compression. The carbon dioxide becomes a supercritical fluid. Several types of compressors can be used, including dual layer cylindrical compressors, scroll compressors, and dual stage rotary compressors.
 At the second stage a heat exchanger transfers energy from the hot refrigerant into water to produce hot water. Water temperatures around 5°C and up are suitable at this stage.
 Finally, ejector or expansion valves reduce pressure on the refrigerant, letting it cool via adiabatic expansion and revert to CO2 gas.

The EcoCute can derive two to five units of heat energy from ambient air for every unit of input electrical energy. It produces three to five units of hot water energy, resulting in reduced CO2 emissions compared to water heating via electricity or natural gas. To produce 90°C hot water, an EcoCute consumes 66% less electricity than an electric water heater, and costs 80% less than heating water via natural gas in Japan. Also, by reducing use of fossil fuels, the EcoCute results in more than 50% reductions in CO2 emissions

Not considering upstream losses of input source energy, the EcoCute's COP is 3.8 in industrial use, while electric power water heating is 1.0, and gas boiler is 0.88 including pilot light loss.

Others 
 is a registered trademark (No. 4575216 – Japan) of Kansai Electric Power Company.

See also 
 Transcritical cycle
 R-744

References

External links
 Mayekawa Global ECO CUTE

Heat pumps
Consumer electronics
Heating, ventilation, and air conditioning
Energy conservation